Michael Ruben Rinaldi (born 21 December 1995) is an Italian motorcycle racer, competing in the Superbike World Championship aboard a Ducati Panigale R. Rinaldi has also previously competed in the European Superstock 1000 Championship, where he was champion in 2017, the European Superstock 600 Championship, the CIV Moto3 Championship and the Coppa Italia 125 cc 2T, where he was champion in 2011.

Career statistics

Grand Prix motorcycle racing

By season

Races by year
(key) (Races in bold indicate pole position; races in italics indicate fastest lap)

Superbike World Championship

Races by year
(key) (Races in bold indicate pole position; races in italics indicate fastest lap)

* Season still in progress.

References

External links
 

1995 births
Living people
Italian motorcycle racers
Moto3 World Championship riders
Sportspeople from Rimini
FIM Superstock 1000 Cup riders
Superbike World Championship riders